Jon Batiste is an American musician, bandleader and television personality. 

The following are a list of his wins and nominations for awards in music. He has won an Academy Award, British Academy Film Award, and Golden Globe Award for his original score of the Disney-Pixar film Soul (2020). He has also won five Grammy Awards from fourteen nominations, including Album of the Year for We Are (2021).

Major associations

Academy Awards

British Academy Film Awards

Golden Globe Awards

Grammy Awards

News and Documentary Emmy Awards

Primetime Emmy Awards

Miscellaneous awards

American Society of Composers, Authors and Publishers

Annie Awards

Austin Film Critics Association Awards

Black Reel Awards

Chicago Film Critics Association Awards

Critics' Choice Movie Awards

Florida Film Critics Circle Awards

Georgia Film Critics Association Awards

Gold Derby Awards

Hollywood Critics Association Awards

Hollywood Music in Media Awards

Houston Film Critics Society Awards

International Cinephile Society Awards

International Film Music Critics Association Awards

Las Vegas Film Critics Society Awards

Latino Entertainment Journalists Association Film Awards

NAACP Image Awards

Online Film & Television Association Awards

Phoenix Critics Circle Awards

Phoenix Film Critics Society Awards

Pop Awards

San Francisco Bay Area Film Critics Circle Awards

Seattle Film Critics Society Awards

St. Louis Gateway Film Critics Association Awards

Washington D.C. Area Film Critics Association Awards

World Soundtrack Awards

Notes

References

External links

Batiste, Jon